The Eurovision Song Contest is an international song competition organised annually by the European Broadcasting Union (EBU) which features participants representing primarily European countries. One of the stated aims of the contest is that the event is of a non-political nature, and participating broadcasters and performers are precluded from promoting or referring to anything of a political, commercial or similar nature during the contest. However, several controversial moments have occurred since the event's creation in 1956, which have included political tensions between competing countries being reflected in the contest's performances and voting, disqualification of entries due to political references in song lyrics, and demonstrations against certain countries competing due to said country's politics and policies.

Armenia and Azerbaijan 

In , a number of people in Azerbaijan who voted for the Armenian entry were reportedly questioned by Azeri police.  to the  received a name change following claims that it contained a call for recognition of the Armenian genocide, in contradiction to the contest's rules regarding political messaging in competing songs. Controversy erupted again in  when Armenia's Iveta Mukuchyan was shown waving the flag of the Republic of Artsakh, also known as Nagorno-Karabakh, a breakaway state internationally recognised as a part of Azerbaijan but largely inhabited by ethnic Armenians, at the contest's first semi-final. This again contravened Eurovision rules on political gestures and resulted in disciplinary action being levied against Armenian broadcaster ARMTV.

Russia and Ukraine 

In , Ukraine's Jamala won the contest with the song "1944", whose lyrics referenced the deportation of the Crimean Tatars. Given the events in Crimea, many saw this song as a political statement against Russia's actions, however the song was permitted to compete given the perceived historical nature of the song despite protests from the Russian delegation. Offers for Samoylova to compete remotely from a venue in Russia or for a change of artist were rejected by Russia's Channel One, with Russia eventually pulling out of the contest and the EBU reprimanding Ukrainian broadcaster UA:PBC and threatening to exclude Ukraine from future contests.

The appeal alleged that since the beginning of the Russian military intervention in Ukraine in 2014, VGTRK and Channel One have been a mouthpiece for the Russian government and a key tool of political propaganda financed from the Russian state budget. The EBU initially stated that Russia as well as Ukraine would still be allowed to participate in the contest, citing the non-political nature of the event. Following complaints levied by other participating countries, on 25 February, the EBU announced that Russia would not be allowed to take part in the contest, as it would “bring the competition into disrepute.” Ukraine went on to win the contest with the highest number of points from the televote in the contest's history.

Georgian withdrawal in 2009 

Requests by the contest's organisers for the lyrics of the song to be changed were refused by the group, and Georgian broadcaster GPB subsequently withdrew from the event. A number of boycotts of the same event were considered by the Baltic states over Russia's actions in Georgia, however none eventually occurred, with Estonian broadcaster ERR hosting a poll on its website to gauge public opinion on competing in Russia.

Israeli participation 

Its participation in the contest over the years has been at times controversial, but it has remained a regular competitor in the contest and been crowned the winner on four occasions. The country's first appearance was marked by an increased security presence at the contest venue in Luxembourg City than what would have been considered normal in the early 1970s, coming less than a year after the Munich massacre where 11 members of the 1972 Israeli Olympic team were killed by Palestinian terrorists. Armed guards were stationed at the venue, and the audience in attendance were warned not to stand during the show at the risk of being shot.

The contest was regularly broadcast in the Arab world during the 1970s, however as many of these countries did not recognise Israel, their broadcasters typically cut to advertisements when Israel performed. When in  it became apparent that Israel was on course to win the contest, the broadcast in many of these countries was cut short before the end of the voting, with Jordanian broadcaster JRTV explaining the end of their transmission as due to "technical difficulties" and concluding its transmission with an image of a bunch of daffodils; Jordanian media later announced that , the eventual runner-up, had won instead.

Israel's participation in the contest means that many Arab states that are eligible to participate in the contest choose not to do so, however a number of attempts have been made by some of the countries to enter. After being told by the EBU that they would have to broadcast the entire programme in full, including the Israeli entry, Télé Liban responded that they could not guarantee this as it would be incompatible with Lebanese law. The broadcaster therefore withdrew their entry, resulting in sanctions from the EBU due to the late withdrawal.

Israel has hosted the contest on three occasions, with the first two ( and ) being held in Jerusalem. Due to the preparations and rehearsals which accompany the contest, and the Saturday evening timeslot for the final, objections from Orthodox religious leaders in the country regarding the potential interruption to Shabbat have been raised on all three occasions. In 1979, these objections were largely ignored and preparations for the contest were held mostly unchanged from standard, however, Turkey was pressured into withdrawing from the contest by Arab states who objected to a predominantly Muslim country taking part in Israel. Objections were again raised in 1999 with regards to the contest being held around Shabbat, as well as criticism levelled against Dana International, the contest's first trans winner, leading to an attempt to stop the contest being held in Israel at all. However, all of these criticisms were in vain and the contest went ahead as planned.

2019 contest 
Requests were once again received from Orthodox leaders that the contest not interfere with Shabbat, with a letter penned by Yaakov Litzman, leader of the ultra-Orthodox United Torah Judaism party, to several government departments demanding that the contest not violate the holy day. Shalva Band, one of the competing entries in the country's , ultimately withdrew from contention when told that, should they win, they would be required to perform in rehearsals on the Shabbat; the group ultimately performed as an interval act during the contest's second semi-final.

The 2019 contest also saw calls from a number of different groups for a boycott of the event, which included proponents of the Boycott, Divestment and Sanctions (BDS) movement in response to the country's policies towards Palestinians in the West Bank and Gaza, as well as in opposition to what some see as "pinkwashing" by the Israeli government. However, many others also campaigned against a boycott of the event, asserting that any cultural boycott would be antithetical to advancing peace in the region. Most notably, the  entrants Hatari raised banners showing the Palestinian flag as their televoting points were announced in the final; this eventually caused the Icelandic participating broadcaster RÚV to be fined .

Notes

References 

Sources:

External links 

 
 

Eurovision Song Contest
Political controversies